The 2011 Brussels Open (also known as the Brussels Open by GDF Suez for sponsor reasons), was a women's tennis tournament played on outdoor clay courts. It was the first edition of the Brussels Open, and was part of the Premier-level tournaments of the 2011 WTA Tour. The event took place at the Royal Primerose Tennis Club in Brussels, Belgium, from 14 May until 21 May 2011. First-seeded Caroline Wozniacki won the singles title.

Finals

Singles

 Caroline Wozniacki defeated  Peng Shuai 2–6, 6–3, 6–3
 It was Wozniacki's 16th career title and 4th of the year.

Doubles

 Andrea Hlaváčková /  Galina Voskoboeva defeated  Klaudia Jans /  Alicja Rosolska 3–6, 6–0, [10–5]

Prize money and ranking points

Entrants

Seeds

 Seedings are based on the rankings of May 9, 2011.

Other entrants
The following players received wildcards into the main draw:
  Kirsten Flipkens
  An-Sophie Mestach

The following players received entry from the qualifying draw:

  Kaia Kanepi
  Abigail Spears
  Alison van Uytvanck
  Galina Voskoboeva

The following players received entry from a lucky loser spot:
  Irina Falconi

References

External links
 ITF tournament edition details
 Tournament draws

Brussels Open
Brussels Open
May 2011 sports events in Europe
2010s in Brussels